Filippo Mugelli (born 23 June 1997) is an Italian football player. He plays for Scandicci.

Club career
He made his Serie C debut for Gavorrano on 3 September 2017 in a game against Olbia.

On 15 July 2019, he returned to Scandicci.

References

External links
 

1997 births
Living people
People from Bagno a Ripoli
Italian footballers
Association football midfielders
U.S. Gavorrano players
S.S.D. Lucchese 1905 players
Serie C players
Serie D players
Sportspeople from the Metropolitan City of Florence
Footballers from Tuscany